FC Torpedo-BelAZ Zhodino (FK Tarpeda-BelAZ Zhodzina; , Futbolniy klub Torpedo-BelAZ Zhodino) is a Belarusian football club based in Zhodino. They play in the Belarusian Premier League, the top division in Belarusian football. Their home stadium is Torpedo Stadium.

The club is sponsored by the city's machine building factory BelAZ.

History 
Name
1989: BelAZ Zhodino
1993: Torpedo Zhodino
2011: Torpedo-BelAZ Zhodino

Honours
 Belarusian Cup
 Winners: 2015–16
 Runners-up: 2009–10

 Belarusian Super Cup
 Runners-up: 2011, 2017

 Football Championship of the Belarusian SSR
 Winners: 1970, 1971, 1980, 1981

Current squad
As of March 2023

League and Cup history

1 Play-off for the 2011 Premier League spot against the 2010 First League runners-up SKVICH Minsk.
2 Play-off for the 2013 Premier League spot against the 2012 First League runners-up Gorodeya.

Torpedo Zhodino in Europe

Managers
 Yury Maleyew (July 15, 2004 – July 14, 2006)
 Uladzimir Zhuravel (interim) (July 1, 2006 – Nov 4, 2006)
 Oleg Kubarev (Nov 5, 2006 – Dec 13, 2009)
 Aleksandr Brazevich (Jan 11, 2010 – July 14, 2010)
 Aleksandr Lisovskiy (interim) (July 15, 2010 – July 25, 2010)
 Sergei Gurenko (July 26, 2010 – May 4, 2012)
 Vadim Brazovsky (interim) (May 5, 2012 – July 28, 2012)
 Vadim Brazovsky (July 29, 2012 – Nov 2, 2012)
 Aleksandr Martyoshkin (interim) (Nov 3, 2012 – Nov 7, 2012)
 Igor Kriushenko (Nov 8, 2012–)

References

External links
Official Website 

Torpedo-BelAZ Zhodino
Zhodzina
BelAZ
Association football clubs established in 1961
1961 establishments in Belarus